South River Presbyterian Church is a historic Presbyterian church located near Garland, Bladen County, North Carolina.  It was built between 1855 and 1857, and is a one-story, rectangular frame Greek Revival-style church.  It has a pedimented roof and is sheathed in weatherboard.

It was added to the National Register of Historic Places in 1996.

References

Presbyterian churches in North Carolina
Churches on the National Register of Historic Places in North Carolina
Churches completed in 1857
19th-century Presbyterian church buildings in the United States
Churches in Bladen County, North Carolina
National Register of Historic Places in Bladen County, North Carolina
1857 establishments in North Carolina